The 2008 Women's Four Nations Cup was the inaugural Hockey Four Nations Cup, an international women's field hockey tournament, consisting of a series of test matches. It was held in Germany, from July 4 to 6, 2018, and featured four of the top nations in women's field hockey.

Competition format
The tournament featured the national teams of India, South Korea, the United States, and the hosts, Germany, competing in a round-robin format, with each team playing each other once. Three points were awarded for a win, one for a draw, and none for a loss.

Officials
The following umpires were appointed by the International Hockey Federation to officiate the tournament:

 Amy Hassick (USA)
 Kang Hyun-Young (KOR)
 Anne McRae (SCO)
 Petra Müller (GER)
 Anupama Puchimanda (IND)

Results
All times are local (Central European Summer Time).

Pool

Fixtures

Statistics

Goalscorers

References

External links
Tournament Website

2008
2008 in women's field hockey
field hockey